Mathias Énard (born 1972) is a French novelist. He studied Persian and Arabic and spent long periods in the Middle East. He has lived in Barcelona for about fifteen years, interrupted in 2013 by a writing residency in Berlin. He won the 2015 Prix Goncourt for Boussole (Compass). In 2020 he was Friedrich Dürrenmatt Guest Professor for World Literature at the University of Bern.

Awards and honours
2004 Prix des cinq continents de la francophonie for La Perfection du tir
2004 Prix Edmée-de-La-Rochefoucauld for La Perfection du tir
2008 Prix Décembre for Zone
2008 Prix Candide for Zone
2008 Bourse Thyde-Monnier SGDL for Zone
2008 Prix Cadmous for Zone
2009 Prix Initiales for Zone
2009 Inter Book Prize for Zone
2010 Prix Goncourt des Lycéens for Parle-leur de batailles, de rois et d'élephants
2013 Prix Roman-News for Rue des voleurs
2015 Best Translated Book Award longlist for Street of Thieves, translated by Charlotte Mandell 
2015 Prix Goncourt for Boussole
2016 Officer of the Order of Arts and Letters
2017 Man Booker International Prize shortlist for Compass, translated by Charlotte Mandell
2017 Premio Gregor von Rezzori – Città di Firenze for Bussola
2017 Leipzig Book Award for European Understanding

Works 
 La Perfection du tir, éditions Actes Sud, 2003. Prix des cinq continents de la francophonie.
 Remonter l'Orénoque, éditions Actes Sud, 2005.
 Bréviaire des artificiers, éditions Verticales, 2007.
 Zone, éditions Actes Sud, 2008. Prix Décembre and Prix du livre Inter.
 translated as Zone by Charlotte Mandell, Open Letter Books, 2010; Fitzcarraldo Editions, 2014. 
 Parle-leur de batailles, de rois et d'éléphants, éditions Actes Sud, 2010. Prix Goncourt des Lycéens.
 translated as Tell Them of Battles, Kings, and Elephants by Charlotte Mandell, New Directions, 2018,  
 L'alcool et la nostalgie, Éditions Inculte, 2011.
 Rue des voleurs, éditions Actes Sud, 2012.
 translated as Street of Thieves by Charlotte Mandell. Open Letter Books, 2014; Fitzcarraldo Editions, 2015.
 Tout sera oublié, éditions Actes Sud, 2013.
 Boussole, éditions Actes Sud, 2015.
 translated as Compass by Charlotte Mandell, New Directions Publishing, 2017; Fitzcarraldo Editions, 2017.
 J'y mets ma langue à couper, Bayard Éditions, 2020.
 Le Banquet annuel de la Confrérie des fossoyeurs, éditions Actes Sud, 2020.

See also 
 Candide Preis

References 

20th-century French non-fiction writers
21st-century French non-fiction writers
Academic staff of the Autonomous University of Barcelona
Prix Décembre winners
Prix Goncourt winners
Prix du Livre Inter winners
Prix Goncourt des lycéens winners
École du Louvre alumni
French male novelists
Officiers of the Ordre des Arts et des Lettres
People from Niort
1972 births
Living people
20th-century French male writers